Esmeralda is a 1970 Venezuelan telenovela produced by José Enrique Crousillat and directed by Grazio D’Angelo for Venevisión. It is based on an original story written by the Cuban Writer Delia Fiallo. The telenovela it stars Lupita Ferrer and José Bardina as main characters.

Cast 
 Lupita Ferrer as Esmeralda Rivera
 José Bardina as Juan Pablo Peñalver
 Ada Riera as Graciela Peñalver
 Eva Blanco as Blanca
 Ivonne Attas as Silvia Zamora
 Esperanza Magaz as Dominga
 Orángel Delfín as Marcos Malaver
 Néstor Zavarce as Adrián Lucero
 Hugo Pimentel as Rogelio Peñalver
 Libertad Lamarque as Sister Piedad

International adaptation 
The first adaptation of the telenovela is Topacio, produced by the Venezuelan television channel Radio Caracas Televisión in 1985. In 1997 Televisa produced a version with the same name starring Leticia Calderón. In 2004, the Brazilian channel SBT also produced a version with the same name. In 2017 Televisa returned to make another more modern version of the story, entitled Sin tu mirada.

References

External links 
 

1970 telenovelas
Venezuelan telenovelas
Spanish-language telenovelas
Venevisión telenovelas
1970 Venezuelan television series debuts
1971 Venezuelan television series endings
Television shows set in Venezuela